Harrisonburg High School (HHS), part of the Harrisonburg City School System, is a public high school located in Harrisonburg, Virginia, United States. HHS serves grades nine through twelve, and its athletic teams are known as the Blue Streaks. In October 2017, 1782 students were enrolled. It was rated "Fully Accredited" by the Virginia Department of Education for the 2017–2018 school year.

History
Harrisonburg High School was founded in 1879 and was initially located on South Main Street. In 1928, it was moved to South High Street; in 1967, the high school was moved to Grace Street. During this time it housed students from grades seven upward, but when Thomas Harrison Middle School was built in 1989, grades seven and eight were shifted from the high school department, and the high school expanded to include both South High Street and Grace Street complexes. The complex was used to hold wrestling shows for Jim Cornette and his Smokey Mountain Wrestling promotion until its closure in 1995.
The entire complex renovated in 1994, on its hundredth anniversary, but was subsequently leased and later sold to James Madison University, after the construction and opening of a new building on Garbers Church Road on August 24, 2005.  The HHS school board has agreed to move to One Court Square in Harrisonburg; its plans were endorsed by the Harrisonburg City Council on February 8, 2011. In August 2019, the Harrisonburg City Council announced the plan to build a second high school in Harrisonburg in order to alleviate overcrowding in HHS.

VHSL titles

Harrisonburg is in the Group AA Valley District of the Virginia High School League. Prior to 2007, it had been in Region II, but is now in Region V.

1969 – 1976 State AA Boys Tennis Champions
1978, 1979 State AA Boys Basketball Champions
1979 State AA Girls Outdoor Track Champions
1980 – 1982 State AA Girls Tennis Champions
1991 State AA Boys Tennis Champions
1991 State AA Girls Tennis Champions
1987, 1989, 1993 State AA Creative Writing
1994 State AA Girls Outdoor Track Champions (tied with Abingdon)
1996 State AA Boys Golf Champions
2001 State AA Division 3 Football Champions
2007 State AA Boys Outdoor Track Champions
2007–08 State AA Theatre Champions
2011–2012 State AA Debate Champions

Notable alumni 
 Henry G. Blosser (1928–2013), Nuclear physicist and winner of the Tom W. Bonner Prize in Nuclear Physics
 Akeem Jordan – Former NFL football player
 John Otho Marsh Jr. – Career U.S. Army officer (1944–1976), U.S. Representative from the State of Virginia (1963–1971), and as the Secretary of the Army under Presidents Ronald Reagan and George Bush (1981–1989)
Bill Mims – Current Justice of the Supreme Court of Virginia, former Virginia Attorney General
Ralph Sampson – Former NBA basketball player
Howard Stevens – Former NFL football player
Kristi Toliver – Current WNBA basketball player
 Landon Turner – Current NFL football player
John Wade – Retired NFL football player

References

External links

Buildings and structures in Harrisonburg, Virginia
Education in Harrisonburg, Virginia
Public high schools in Virginia
Educational institutions established in 1879
1879 establishments in Virginia